Thomas Burchell may refer to:
Thomas Burchell (cricketer) (1875–1951), cricketer 
Thomas Burchell, Jamaican missionary

See also
Thomas Burchill, American Congressman